Merimandroso is a town and commune in Madagascar. It belongs to the district of Ambohidratrimo, which is a part of Analamanga Region. The population of the commune was estimated to be approximately 14,545 in 2018.

References and notes 

Populated places in Analamanga